The Adena culture was a Pre-Columbian Native American culture that existed from 500 BCE to 100 CE, in a time known as the Early Woodland period. The Adena culture refers to what were probably a number of related Native American societies sharing a burial complex and ceremonial system. The Adena culture was centered on the location of the modern state of Ohio, but also extended into contiguous areas of northern Kentucky, eastern Indiana, West Virginia, and parts of extreme western Pennsylvania.

Importance
The Adena culture was named for the large mound on Thomas Worthington's early 19th-century estate located near Chillicothe, Ohio, which he named "Adena",

The culture is the most prominently known of a number of similar cultures in eastern North America that began mound building ceremonialism at the end of the Archaic period. The geographic range of the Adena sites is centered on central and southern Ohio, with further sites in contiguous areas of the surrounding states of Indiana, Kentucky, West Virginia and Pennsylvania. The importance of the Adena complex comes from its considerable influence on other contemporary cultures and cultures that came after it The Adena culture is seen as the precursor to the traditions of the Hopewell tradition, which are sometimes thought as an elaboration, or zenith, of Adena traditions.

The Adena were notable for their agricultural practices, pottery, artistic works, and extensive trading network, which supplied them with a variety of raw materials, ranging from copper from the Great Lakes to shells from the Gulf Coast.

Art and religion

Mounds
Lasting traces of Adena culture are still seen in the remains of their substantial earthworks. At one point, larger Adena mounds numbered in the hundreds, but only a small number of the remains of the larger Adena earthen monuments still survive today. These earthen monuments were built using hundreds of thousands of baskets full of specially selected and graded earth. According to archaeological investigations, Adena earthworks were often built as part of their burial rituals, in which the earth of the earthwork was piled immediately atop a burned mortuary building. These mortuary buildings were intended to keep and maintain the dead until their final burial was performed. Before the construction of the earthworks, some utilitarian and grave goods would be placed on the floor of the structure, which was burned with the goods and honored dead within. The earthwork would then be constructed, and often a new mortuary structure would be placed atop the new earthwork. After a series of repetitions, mortuary/earthwork/mortuary/earthwork, a quite prominent earthwork would remain. In the later Adena period, circular ridges of unknown function were sometimes constructed around the burial earthworks.

Prominent mounds

Stone tablets
The Adena also carved small stone tablets, usually 4 or 5 inches by 3 or 4 inches by .5 inches thick. On one or both flat sides were gracefully composed stylized zoomorphs or curvilinear geometric designs in deep relief. Paint has been found on some Adena tablets, leading archaeologists to propose that these stone tablets were probably used to stamp designs on cloth or animal hides, or onto their own bodies. It is possible that they were used to outline designs for tattooing.

Timber circles

Postholes from a number of timber circles have been found during excavations of Adena culture causewayed ring ditch sites in the Bluegrass region of Kentucky and adjacent regions of Ohio and West Virginia. A notable example was found by archaeologist William S. Webb during the excavations of the Mount Horeb Site 1 in Fayette County, Kentucky in 1939. Webb discovered a circle of "paired-posts" inside of the embankment ring and ditch. The  circle was made up of sixty two "paired" post sets and eight single posts.

Pottery
Unlike in other cultures, Adena pottery was not buried with the dead or the remains of the cremated, as were other artifacts. Usually Adena pottery was tempered with grit or crushed limestone and was very thick; its decoration was largely plain, cord-marked or fabric marked, although one type bore a nested-diamond design incised into its surface. The vessel shapes were sub-conoidal or flat-bottomed jars, sometimes with small foot-like supports.

Domestic life

Settlement patterns
The large and elaborate mound sites served a nearby scattering of people. The population was dispersed in small settlements of one to two structures. A typical house was built in a circle form from 15 to 45 feet in diameter. The walls were made of paired posts tilted outward, that were then joined to other pieces of wood to form a cone shaped roof. The roof was then covered with bark and the walls may have been bark and/or wickerwork.

Food sources
Their sustenance was acquired through foraging and the cultivation of native plants.
 Hunted deer, elk, black bear, woodchuck, beaver, porcupine, turkey, trumpeter swan, and ruffed grouse.
 Gathered several edible seed, grasses, and nuts.
 Cultivated pumpkin, squash, sunflower, and goosefoot.

Tools

The Adena ground stone tools and axes. Somewhat rougher slab-like stones with chipped edges were probably used as hoes. Bone and antler were used in small tools, but even more prominently in ornamental objects such as beads, combs, and worked animal-jaw gorgets or paraphernalia. Spoons, beads and other implements were made from the marine conch. A few copper axes have been found, but otherwise the metal was hammered into ornamental forms, such as bracelets, rings, beads, and reel-shaped pendants.

See also
 Hopewell tradition
 Old Copper complex

References

External links

 Ohio Memory
 Ohio Historical Society's Archaeology Page
 Virtual First Ohioans's webpage on the Adena
 Introduction to North America's Native People: Adena people
  Ancient Earthworks of Eastern North America Photo Galleries

 
Formative period in the Americas
Archaeological cultures of North America
Pre-Columbian cultures
Pre-Columbian archaeology
Pre-statehood history of Ohio
Early Woodland period
Prehistoric cultures in Ohio